Minangkabau  Express is an airport rail link service in West Sumatra, Indonesia. This line was built to cut travel time from Padang city centre to the Minangkabau International Airport in Padang Pariaman Regency, as roads connecting the airport and the city center are frequently affected by traffic congestion.

The Minangkabau Express is the third airport rail link in Indonesia after Kualanamu ARS and Soekarno–Hatta ARS. It was inaugurated by President Joko Widodo on 21 May 2018.

Background

The  link was established using existing and new rail tracks. An existing line between Duku railway station and Padang was upgraded. This was then connected to a new  track between Duku and the airport. All land acquisitions were done in March 2017.

The service is provided by PT Kereta Api Indonesia, with trains running between ––Duku–Minangkabau International Airport. The rolling stock was manufactured by INKA.

See also

Kualanamu Airport Rail Link
Soekarno–Hatta Airport Rail Link
Adisumarmo Airport Rail Link

References

Airport rail links in Indonesia
Transport in Padang
Passenger rail transport in Indonesia